HMAS Lonsdale is a former Royal Australian Navy (RAN) training base that was located at Beach Street, Victoria, Australia. Originally named Cerberus III, the Naval Reserve Base was commissioned as HMAS Lonsdale on 1 August 1940 during the Second World War.

Lonsdale was decommissioned in 1992, and the site now houses a luxury apartment complex known as HM@S Lonsdale, designed by Fender Katsalidis Architects.

See also
List of former Royal Australian Navy bases

References

Closed facilities of the Royal Australian Navy
Military education and training in Australia
1940 establishments in Australia
Military units and formations established in 1940
1992 disestablishments in Australia
Military units and formations disestablished in 1992